Kommuna (also, Çaylı Kommuna and Chayly Kommuna) is a village and municipality in the Qazakh Rayon of Azerbaijan.  It has a population of 1,002.

References 

Populated places in Qazax District